Ussaramanna, Soramànna in Sardinian language, is a comune (municipality) in the Province of South Sardinia in the Italian region Sardinia, located about  northwest of Cagliari and about  north of Sanluri.

Ussaramanna borders the following municipalities: Baradili, Baressa, Pauli Arbarei, Siddi, Turri. The economy is based on agriculture, with the production of vine and olive oil.

References

Cities and towns in Sardinia